Josep Benet i Morell (Cervera, April 14, 1920 - Sant Cugat del Vallès, March 24, 2008) was a Catalan politician, historian and publisher. Educated at the Escolania de Montserrat, from a very young age he participated in the Catalan nationalist movement and belonged to the Federation of Young Christians of Catalonia. One of the most prominent figures of political Catalanism in the XXth Century. As a parliamentarian, he was a member of the Committee of Twenty that drew up the preliminary draft of the Statute of Autonomy of Catalonia of 1979.

Books 

 1964: Maragall i la Setmana Tràgica,
 1968: El Doctor Torras i Bages en el marc del seu temps
 1973: Catalunya sota el règim franquista
 1990: Exili i mort del president Companys
 1992: El president Tarradellas en els seus textos (1954-1988)
 1995: L'intent franquista de genocidi cultural de Catalunya
 1998: La mort del president Companys
 1999: Carles Rahola, afusellat
 2003: Escrits en defensa pròpia
 2003: Domènec Latorre, afusellat per catalanista
 2008: De l'esperança a la desfeta (1920-1939) 
 2008: El meu jurament de 1939
 2008: Joan Peiró, afusellat
 2009: Manuel Carrasco i Formiguera, afusellat

References 

Politicians from Catalonia